Harry Vincent McChesney (June 1, 1880 – August 11, 1960), nicknamed "Pud", was a professional American football player, as well as a professional baseball player. He played 22 games in the majors in 1904 for the Chicago Cubs. The rest of his 12-year career was spent in the minors, where he played in the Western League, the American Association (AA), the New York State League and the Texas League.

Prior to his professional baseball career, McChesney played for the Pittsburgh Stars of the first National Football League (NFL) as well as the Massillon Tigers of the Ohio League and the Pittsburgh Athletic Club. He was considered one of the best punters of his era.

External links
Harry McChesney Major League Stats from Baseball Reference
Harry McChesney Minor League Stats from Baseball Reference

1880 births
1960 deaths
Baseball players from Pittsburgh
Players of American football from Pittsburgh
Major League Baseball outfielders
Binghamton Bingoes players
Chicago Cubs players
Des Moines Prohibitionists players
Elmira Colonels players
Fort Worth Panthers players
Indianapolis Indians players
Massillon Tigers players
Milwaukee Brewers (minor league) players
Omaha Rourkes players
Pittsburgh Athletic Club (football) players
Pittsburgh Stars players
Pueblo Indians players
St. Joseph Drummers players
Troy Trojans (minor league) players
Burials at Allegheny Cemetery